The Nieuwe Kerk ("New Church") in Katwijk, the Netherlands, is the oldest and best known work of the architect H.J. Jesse (1860–1943). It was built to replace the nearby Andreaskerk, which had become too small.

Construction of the church 
Plans for building a new church were first considered in 1850. The search for a suitable location for the church began in 1883. The church authorities held a design contest, and about 53 designs were sent in. They chose the design of H.J. Jesse. Construction started in 1885, with the first stone being laid by the Baroness Van Wassenaer van Catwijck. The construction took two years, and the new church was opened in 1887. It is now a state monument.

Jesse designed a broad cross-shaped church with 1500 seats. The capacity was later extended to 2000 seats. The building consists of two wide, short aisles and a long transept. The church tower is approximately 51 meters high.

Gallery

External links

Pipe Organ Details
About the church organ
The church choir

Churches in South Holland
Katwijk
Churches completed in 1887
19th-century churches in the Netherlands